6 Boötis is a binary star system in the northern constellation of Boötes, located around 460 light years away from the Sun. It has the Bayer designation e Boötis; 6 Boötis is the Flamsteed designation. The system is visible to the naked eye as a faint, orange-hued star with an apparent visual magnitude of 4.92. It is moving closer to the Earth with a heliocentric radial velocity of −3 km/s.

The visible component is an evolved giant star with a stellar classification of K4 III. At the estimated distance of the star, this yields a physical size of about 38 times the radius of the Sun. The star is radiating 430 times the luminosity of the Sun from its enlarged photosphere at an effective temperature of 4,050 K. Its companion is probably a low mass red dwarf of around class M8 V.

References

K-type giants
M-type main-sequence stars
Spectroscopic binaries
Boötes
Bootis, e
Durchmusterung objects
Bootis, 06
120539
067480
5201